Events in the year 2016 in Kosovo.

Incumbents 
 President: Atifete Jahjaga (until April 7) Hashim Thaçi (from April 7)
 Prime Minister: Isa Mustafa

Events 
 3 May – Kosovo is allowed membership of FIFA and UEFA.
 5–21 August – Kosovo competes at the 2016 Summer Olympics in Rio de Janeiro, the first time the country had sent competitors to the event since the expulsion of Yugoslavia from the Games in 1992.

Deaths

See also 

 2016 in Europe

References 

 
Kosovo
Kosovo
2010s in Kosovo
Years of the 21st century in Kosovo